Yellow Jacket Case is a smart phone case that doubles as a stun gun. It was invented by former military police officer Seth Froom  in response to being robbed at gun-point in his own home. The Yellow Jacket case houses a 650,000V Stun-gun. 

Yellow Jacket was originally a tenant of the Student Incubator at the Louisiana Business Technology Center and was a prize winner of the Venture Challenge business plan competition. Now Yellow Jacket is produced by Stinger Solutions, LLC.

References

External links 

Companies based in Louisiana